Thai Pakdee Party it is a Royalist political party in Thailand. It was established in 2021 by Warong Dechkitvikrom.

Activities 
It was established in 2021 by Warong Dechkitvikrom, a former doctor and former Member of Parliament of Phitsanulok Province under the Democrat Party, the leader of the Thai Pakdee group  has gathered a network of people who are loyal to the monarchy  and a democratic system with the King as Head of State.

Later on Sunday, June 26, 2022, the Thai Phakdi Party held its 2/2022 Annual General Meeting to elect additional party executive committees. The meeting resolved to elect Thepparat Rangsit, grandson of Her Royal Highness Vibhavadi Rangsit and great-grandson of Prince Rangsit Prayurasakdi and Worachat Jintaprateepkowit it is the party's executive committee.

References 

Political parties in Thailand